Tempoal Municipality is one of the 212 municipalities of the Mexican state of Veracruz. It is located in the state's Huasteca Alta region. The municipal seat is Tempoal, Veracruz.

In the 2005 INEGI Census, the municipality reported a total population of 33,107 
(down from 35,600 in 1995), 
of whom 12,237 lived in the municipal seat. 
Of the municipality's inhabitants, 3252 (9.33%) spoke an indigenous language, primarily Wastek (Huasteco).

Tempoal Municipality covers a total surface area of 1,487.15 km2.

Settlements in the municipality
Tempoal (municipal seat; 2005 population 12,237)
Corozal (population 2,000)
El AguacateTerrero (1,200)
Horcón Potrero (1,100)

References

External links
Tempoal Web page of the Veracruz State Govt. Accessed 6 November 2008.

Municipalities of Veracruz